The following lists events that happened during 1899 in the Philippine Republic.

Incumbents

First Philippine Republic
President: Emilio Aguinaldo (starting January 23)
Prime Minister: 
 Apolinario Mabini (January 23 – May 7)
 Pedro A. Paterno (May 7 – November 13)
President of the Assembly of Representatives: Pedro A. Paterno

U.S. Military Government
Governor: Elwell Stephen Otis

Events

January
 January 23 – Malolos Constitution is proclaimed in Malolos, Bulacan, establishing the First Philippine Republic. Emilio Aguinaldo inaugurated as President of the Republic.

February
 February 4–5 – 12,000 American troops advanced through 2 miles of Filipino front at the Battle of Manila. It was the first and largest battle of the Philippine–American War, resulting to 60 American dead and 2,000 Filipino dead.
 February 10 – A brigade of American soldiers attacked Filipino troops after 3 hours of artillery bombardment at the Battle of Caloocan. The capture of Caloocan left American forces in control of the southern terminus of the Manila to Dagupan railway, along with five engines, fifty passenger coaches, and a hundred freight cars.

March
 March 27 – American troops marched through Marilao River while being fired upon by Filipino troops on the opposite bank.
 March 31 – Malolos, the capital of the Republic, fell to advancing American soldiers.

April
 April 9–10 – American troops fought the Battle of Santa Cruz as part of their Laguna de Bay campaign.
 April 23 – The Battle of Quingua was fought between Filipino troops led by General Gregorio del Pilar and American troops under Major J. Franklin Bell. There was a short Filipino victory until reinforcements sealed eventual American victory.

May
 May 7 – Local elections were held for provincial and municipal posts throughout the Philippine Archipelago under the American occupation.
 May 11 – The country adopts PHT as its standard time at exactly 12:00 a.m., prior to the adoption, each location in the country observed its own solar mean time.

June
 June 5 – General Antonio Luna is assassinated in Cabanatuan, Nueva Ecija.
 June 13 – 3,000 American soldiers were confronted by 5,000 Filipino soldiers in the second largest battle of the Philippine–American War, the Battle of Zapote River. American victory gave respect to General Henry Ware Lawton.

November
 November 13 – President Aguinaldo, after a conference in Bayambang, Pangasinan, declared guerrilla warfare in the continued Filipino struggle against American occupation.

December
 December 2 – A 60-man rear guard action led by General Gregorio del Pilar fought 500 American troops who were pursuing President Aguinaldo in his flight to land's end.

Holidays
As a former colony of Spanish Empire and being a catholic country, the following were considered holidays:
 January 1 – New Year's Day
 March 30 – Maundy Thursday
 March 31 – Good Friday
 December 25 – Christmas Day

Deaths
 February 4 – José Torres Bugallón, Filipino military officer (b. 1873)
 June 5 – Antonio Luna, Filipino pharmacist and general (b. 1866)
 December 2 – Gregorio del Pilar, Filipino general (b. 1875)

References

 
Years of the 19th century in the Philippines
1890s in the Philippines
Philippines
Philippines